The women's javelin throw event at the 2000 World Junior Championships in Athletics was held in Santiago, Chile, at Estadio Nacional Julio Martínez Prádanos on 19 and 20 October.

Medalists

Results

Final
20 October

Qualifications
19 October

Group A

Group B

Participation
According to an unofficial count, 21 athletes from 17 countries participated in the event.

References

Javelin throw
Javelin throw at the World Athletics U20 Championships